Nick Ries (born 14 July 1982) is a former Australian rules footballer who played as a midfielder for the Hawthorn Football Club in the Australian Football League (AFL). He was drafted at pick 21 in the 2000 AFL Draft.

From 2002 to 2004 he played 60 out of a possible 66 matches until the arrival of Alastair Clarkson as senior coach. He was one of several players former club legend David Parkin labeled as a Mummy's Boy because of his lightweight frame. He slipped down the selection order in 2005 and managed only nine games in 2006, and was delisted at the end of the season.  He was nominated for the AFL Rising Star award in Round 17 of the 2002 AFL season.

He was educated at Wesley College, Melbourne.

References

External links

Living people
1982 births
Hawthorn Football Club players
People educated at Wesley College (Victoria)
Sandringham Dragons players
Box Hill Football Club players
Australian rules footballers from Victoria (Australia)